Energia are an English dance-pop/house/electronica production act, consisting of record producer/composer Marc Andrewes and various guest vocalists. They are best known for the track "Get The Freak Out", which represented the United Kingdom in the 2006 Euro Video Grand Prix, the European Music Video Festival.

Career
The act was formed in 1999 to front an entry for the Eurovision Song Contest "All Time High", featuring vocalist Ann McCabe, which reached the final eight in the Great British Song Contest. 

Several club chart hits followed, including the self-titled "Energia", and its vocal version "I’m Alive", which charted on two official UK club charts, reaching number 8 in the Music Week upfront club breakers chart and number 11 in the commercial pop chart.

In 2006 their track "Get The Freak Out", featuring Irina, was chosen to represent the United Kingdom in the 2006 Euro Video Grand Prix, the European Music Video Festival. Irina is Irina Gligor, who has also appeared in the 2004 Eurovision Song Contest, having co-written the entry for Romania, "I Admit", performed by Sanda. Irina was a vocalist in Sanda's backing group.

Their most recent single was "This Game", a 2007 cover version of a 1980s record by the band President Reagan is Clever. This reached number 9 in the Music Week upfront club chart in July 2007.

Discography

Singles
1999: "All Time High" - Biondi Records
2003: "Energia" – Biondi Records
2003: "I'm Alive" – Biondi Records
2004: "Synergy" – Biondi Records
2005: "Get The Freak Out" (featuring Irina) – Biondi Records
2007: "This Game" – Biondi Records

Albums
2004: 15 Years of Biondi Music – Energia/ Various Artists - Biondi Records

References

External links
Official website
Energia’s UK label (Biondi Records)
Eurovision.tv - the official website of the Eurovision Song Contest

English house music groups
English dance music groups
English record producers